Saivar Thirumeni is a 2001 Indian Malayalam-language action drama film directed by Shajoon Karyal and written by Robin Thirumala. It features Suresh Gopi, Manoj K. Jayan, Samyuktha Varma, Narendra Prasad, Nedumudi Venu,  Jagathy Sreekumar, Sangeetha Mohan, and K. P. A. C. Lalitha. The music was composed by Raveendran. The plot revolves around Devadatthan (Suresh Gopi), a Namboothiri youth. This movie is dubbed in Telugu as Dhairyavanthudu and in Hindi as Jung ka maidan.

Synopsis
Mazhamangalath Narayanan Namboothirippadu is the head of a prestigious Mazhamangalam family. His elder son is Mazhamangalath Kunjikuttan and younger son is Mazhamangalath Devadathan Namboothirippadu, popularly known as Saayvar Thirumeni. His friends are Kunjappu and Neelakandan who believe Saayvar more than anyone else. Saayvar looks after their estate at Kunthapuram in Karnataka and people there call him Saayvar Thirumeni, out of respect and love.

One day Narayanan was honoured by the villagers for winning the Kendra Sahithya academy award. One of the elephants named Ganeshan turns violent but is calmed down by Saayvar. He is appreciated by the villagers for saving the people from the violent pachyderm. Saayvar knows from his friend Kunjappu that the elephant was turned violent by their family rivals. Saayvar goes to meet them and gives them a final warning.

Later he goes to church where he meets his friend Fr. Kuruvithadam along with orphans. Even as a Brahmin, Saayvar looks after the orphans. Saayvar sings a melodious Christian song to the orphans. He meets Annie at the church. Annie is the daughter of Fr. Kuruvithadam's brother. Annie has come to that village to learn Kathakali. Saayvar's sister Bhaama is also a student at the school. Annie and Saayvar quarrel at the beginning. As the story moves forward Annie learns from Fr. Kuruvithadam that the orphans were looked after by Saayvar which leads her to fall in love with him. She learns more about him from Bhaama.

The next scene shows Saayvar meeting his cousin Mithran. Mithran seeks help from Saayvar to save him and his friend Saam from Paappa. Saayvar once saved Paappa from an accident and they friends. Mithran cheated Paappa in their business deal and Saayvar was unaware of this.

Saayvar sets out with Kunjappu and Neelakandan to solve the issue with Paappa. On the way Paappa's goons attack Mithran, but Saayvar fights back and goes to meet Paappa at home. Saayvar solves the issue, but Mithran quarrels with Paappa again which ends the friendship of Paappa and Saayvar. Paappa warns Saayvar not to believe Mithran but he does not want to mistrust his cousin. Mithran's aim is to destroy Saayvar's family as his mother (Saayvar's father's sister) was sent out of their family for loving a man of another caste. Also during their childhood, Saayvar caught Mithran stealing their family goddess's statue which leads Mithran to run away. Mithran wanted to avenge this.

He finds a photo of Saayavar along with a girl named Sreekutty. This is shown to Narayanan by Mithran and when asked about it Saayvar lies that he does not know who the girl is. He is beaten up by Narayanan and sent out from the family. This breaks his relationship with Annie. Later it is proven that Sreekutty was actually Narayanan's daughter who was born to his lover Martha during Narayanan's youth. Saayavar was keeping this a secret as he has given his word to Martha that he will never tell anyone. Saayvar kept his word. At the same time Mithran plays many foul games to destroy the family. He plans to kill Sreekutty and blame Annie's brothers. He kills Saayvar's brother Kunjikuttan. At last it is revealed that Mithran was behind the problems. Saayvar fights Mithran. Mithran is killed by Kunjikuttan's elephant and the family is reunited.

Cast

References

External links
 

2001 films
2000s Malayalam-language films
Indian action drama films
Films directed by Shajoon Kariyal
Films scored by Raveendran